Mony may refer to:

People

 Abdul Hamid Mony (born 1989), Indonesian footballer
 Pierre Mony (1896–1980), French international footballer 
 Olivier Mony (born 1966), French writer and journalist
 Sivaram Mony (born 1991), Indian feature film director and editor 
 Stéphane Mony (1800–1884), French engineer, businessman and politician.

 Mony Marc, Belgian singer
 D. Moni, Indian Marxist politician

Other

MONY (Mutual of New York), an insurance company, now a subsidiary of AXA.
MONY Arizona Classic, a former golf tournament
Mony Mony, a 1968 single by American pop rock band Tommy James and the Shondells
MONY Syracuse Senior Classic, a former golf tournament